Kadiff Kirwan (born 3 February 1989) is a British-Montserratian actor. He is known for his roles in several British television series, particularly Timewasters, Chewing Gum, Fleabag, and The Stranger.

Early life and education
Born and raised in Plymouth, Montserrat, Kirwan moved with his family to Antigua after the 1995 Soufrière Hills volcanic eruption destroyed the family home, and thereafter to Preston, England. There he developed a love of drama; he first acted in school, in a production of Bugsy Malone, when he was 14. On his desire to act, Kirwan said "I was bad at school [...] really bad. And I had a drama teacher who from Year 9 onwards hounded me and told me that my behaviour issues would calm down if I went to drama classes after school. She kept pestering and eventually I went. Suddenly, everything started making sense: I was acting out because I was dealing with being gay and not telling my peers or my family because they’re quite religious [...] I was going through a lot at the time, and acting was the thing that saved me. It gave me my voice."

He graduated from the Central School of Speech and Drama in 2011.

Personal life
Kirwan is openly gay.

Filmography

Film

Television

Theatre

References

External links
 

1989 births
English gay actors
21st-century British male actors
Black British male actors
LGBT Black British people
Montserratian emigrants to the United Kingdom
Actors from Preston, Lancashire
Living people
Montserratian people
Alumni of the Royal Central School of Speech and Drama